Anthony Farage (28 December 1885 in Damascus – 9 November 1963), also Anthony Faraj, was titular archbishop and Patriarchal vicar of the Patriarchal vicariate of Egypt and Sudan.

Life

Anthony Farage was ordained to the priesthood on 20 July 1908. On 1 January 1922 he was appointed and consecrated bishop on the same day. His consecrator was the Patriarch of Antioch Archbishop Demetrius I Qadi. On 11 December 1922 Farage was named titular bishop of Laodicea in Syria of the Greek Melkites and confirmed as Patriarchal Vicar of Alexandria. From 1 January 1922 until his death on 9 November 1963 he was procurator in Antioch. In addition to office he was 1922-1928 Patriarchal Vicar of Alexandria and was the successor of Etienne Soukkarie, his successor to the patriarchal vicar was Dionysius Kfoury. On 7 March 1961 he was appointed Titular Archbishop of Damietta dei Greco-Melkiti.

References

External links
 http://www.catholic-hierarchy.org/bishop/bfara.html
 http://www.gcatholic.org/dioceses/diocese/alex1.htm

1885 births
1963 deaths
Melkite Greek Catholic bishops
Syrian Melkite Greek Catholics
People from Damascus
20th-century Syrian people
20th-century Eastern Catholic archbishops
19th-century Syrian people